Clemence Matawu (born November 29, 1982 in Bindura) is a Zimbabwean football player, who currently plays for Motor Action.

Club 
Matawu is a starting midfielder for Podbeskidzie Bielsko Biala. He has scored 5 goals, and made 24 appearances. He has received a total of 4 yellow cards. Matawu is a fast and agile midfielder who is known to trick around opponents. Precisely his crossing skill is what teams fear the most. Matawu used to play for Motor Action F.C. of  Harare and completed 27 games starting while he was there. Podbeskidzie Bielsko-Biała saw his potential they offered him a  contract which he accepted. He never played another game for Motor Action. In summer 2010 Clemence moved to Polonia Bytom to play in Polish top division. In June 2011 Clement was released by Polonia Bytom and returned to Motor Action F.C.

International 
Matawu has had a colorful international career by starting on the Zimbabwe National Team, and scoring over 1 goal internationally. Matawu has made 29 appearances for the team, resulting in all starts.

References

External links
 
 

1982 births
Living people
Sportspeople from Bindura
Zimbabwean footballers
Podbeskidzie Bielsko-Biała players
Polonia Bytom players
Motor Action F.C. players
Chicken Inn F.C. players
Expatriate footballers in Poland
Zimbabwean expatriate sportspeople in Poland
Zimbabwean expatriate footballers
Association football midfielders
Zimbabwe international footballers